Marache, or historically Smohain, is hamlet of Wallonia in the municipalities of Lasne, district of Plancenoit, and Waterloo, in the province of Walloon Brabant, Belgium. 

It is located in a defile through which runs the Smohain, a stream that rises just to the west of the hamlet.

This was a strong defensive position as:

Later in the battle it was the location where the Prussian right-hand flank joined forces with the Anglo-allies left-hand flank.

See also 
List of Waterloo Battlefield locations

Notes

References

Lasne
Populated places in Walloon Brabant
Waterloo Battlefield locations